The Ghost is a Faroese electropop duo consisting of Filip Mortensen on vocals and
Urbanus Olsen on electronics.

Following their appearance at the Iceland Airwaves music festival, held in Reykjavík, Iceland, the duo received a recording contract with the British Sunday Best record label. The duo also appeared at the  G! Festival, held in Syðrugøta, Faroe Islands, in 2009 and 2010.  In addition, they have performed as the warm-up band for The Wombats, a British indie-rock band;  Ladytron, an English electronic band; and Vampire Weekend, an American indie-rock band.

In 2010, they released their debut album War Kids.

See also

Lists of musicians
List of synthpop artists
Music of the Faroe Islands

References

External links
myspace.com/theghostband, the band's official website

Musical groups with year of establishment missing
Electronic music duos
Faroese musical groups